Zamia cunaria is a species of plant in the family Zamiaceae. It is endemic to the area of Comarca Guna Yala, Panamá. It is common around Llan Cartis Road and Kuna Llala.

References

photo of herbarium specimen at Missouri Botanical Garden, isotype of Zamia cunaria

cunaria
Endemic flora of Panama
Plants described in 1993
Taxonomy articles created by Polbot